Daniela Di Toro and Aniek van Koot defeated the three-time defending champion Esther Vergeer and her partner Sharon Walraven in the final, 3–6, 6–3, [10–4] to win the women's doubles wheelchair tennis title at the 2010 French Open. With the win, they ended Vergeer's 19-major winning streak, dating back at the 2002 French Open.

Korie Homan and Esther Vergeer were the reigning champions, but Homan did not compete this year.

Seeds
 Daniela Di Toro /  Aniek van Koot (champions)
 Esther Vergeer /  Sharon Walraven (final)

Draw

Finals

References
Main Draw

Wheelchair Women's Doubles
French Open, 2010 Women's Doubles